Bergakker is a hamlet in the Dutch province of Gelderland. It is a part of the municipality of Tiel, and lies about 2 km west of Tiel.

Bergakker is known for the Bergakker sword sheath, which was found in a field in 1996.

It was first mentioned in 1899 as Bergakker, and means "farmland on a hill". The hamlet consists of about 80 houses.

References

Populated places in Gelderland
Tiel